Shields railway station was a railway station in Pollokshields,  Glasgow, Scotland.

History
Shields station was built by the Glasgow and South Western Railway when the Paisley Canal Line opened in 1885.

Contemporary maps show that, at Shields Junction, the Glasgow, Paisley and Johnstone Canal and towpath had run alongside the Caledonian Railway line shortly before it connected to the Glasgow and Paisley Joint Railway. There was plenty of space for the development of the new line and station buildings, as the canal had not followed as straight a course as the railway track to replace it would.

After Shields station opened, there were three adjacent stations at Shields Junction operated by different railway companies. Shields Road station and Pollokshields station were situated to the north of Shields station.

References

Notes

Sources

External links 
Photographs and historical maps of Shields Junction, Glasgow, before and after the building of the stations

Disused railway stations in Glasgow
Former Glasgow and South Western Railway stations
Railway stations in Great Britain opened in 1885
Railway stations in Great Britain opened in 1966
Pollokshields